Fakhar Zaman (born 10 April 1990) is a Pakistani cricketer who plays for the Pakistan national cricket team and for Lahore Qalandars in the Pakistan Super League.

On 20 July 2018, he became the first batsman for Pakistan to score a double century in a One Day International (ODI) match. Two days later, he became the fastest batsman to score 1,000 runs in ODIs. In August 2018, he was one of thirty-three players to be awarded a central contract for the 2018–19 season by the Pakistan Cricket Board.

On 4 April 2021, while chasing against South Africa in the second ODI, Fakhar scored 193 before being run out by Quinton de Kock. Fakhar's 193 became the highest individual score while chasing in an ODI surpassing the 185 scored by Shane Watson against Bangladesh.

Early life
Zaman was born on 10 April 1990 in Katlang in the Mardan District of Khyber Pakhtunkhwa. He moved to Karachi at the age of 16 following matriculation. In 2007, Zaman joined the Pakistan Navy as a sailor after receiving his schooling and training at sea from the Pakistan Navy School, Bahadur. His choice of career was persuaded by his father, who was dissuaded by Fakhar's childhood addiction to cricket and wanted his son to focus on his academics. The name Fakhar literally translates to "pride". Amongst his teammates, he is known by the nickname fauji (soldier).

In 2012, he represented the navy in the International Defence Cricket Challenge Cup in Australia and was named best player of the tournament. Later in 2020, the navy awarded him the honorary rank of Lieutenant  in recognition of his contribution to cricket.

Domestic and T20 career
In Karachi, he continued playing cricket occasionally in inter-departmental matches, including representations for the Pakistan Navy cricket team. He was first identified by his navy coach, Azam Khan, who encouraged him to pursue professional cricket. In 2013, he left his naval career after a "tough decision" in pursuit of this dream and began appearing for regional outfits like Khyber Pakhtunkhwa, Abbottabad Falcons, Balochistan and several Karachi teams. He became the second-highest run scorer in the 2016 Pakistan Cup and also impressed selectors in the 2016–17 Quaid-e-Azam Trophy. He was also picked by the Lahore Qalandars side for the 2017 Pakistan Super League, where he was closely mentored by New Zealand player Brendon McCullum. He was soon noticed by Pakistan coach Mickey Arthur during a training camp in Lahore, following which he earned a call-up for the national side.

In August 2017, he was named in Durban Qalandars' squad for the first season of the T20 Global League. However, in October 2017, Cricket South Africa initially postponed the tournament until November 2018, with it being cancelled soon after.

In July 2019, he was selected to play for the Rotterdam Rhinos in the inaugural edition of the Euro T20 Slam cricket tournament. However, the following month the tournament was cancelled.

In January 2021, he was named in Khyber Pakhtunkhwa's squad for the 2020–21 Pakistan Cup.

In December 2022, he was signed by the Khulna Tigers for the 2022–23 Bangladesh Premier League.

International career

International debut
In March 2017, he was named in Pakistan's limited overs squad for their matches against the West Indies. He made his Twenty20 International (T20I) debut for Pakistan against the West Indies on 30 March 2017.

In April 2017, he was named in Pakistan's One Day International (ODI) squad for the 2017 ICC Champions Trophy. He made his ODI debut for Pakistan against South Africa in the Champions Trophy on 7 June 2017, scoring 31 runs.

In the final against India, Zaman edged to the wicket-keeper, when he was on 3, but survived as it was a no-ball. After that, Zaman went on to score his maiden ODI century and helped Pakistan post a total of 338. With that, Zaman became the first batsman for Pakistan to score a century in an ICC event final. India batting second collapsed and Pakistan won the match by 180 runs to become the winners of Champions Trophy for the first time. Zaman was adjudged man of the match for his batting performance. Zaman and Azhar Ali's partnership in the match was 128 runs, making it the highest opening partnership in the Champions Trophy history for Pakistan, and the highest opening partnership in an ODI for Pakistan since 2009.

2018: England, Zimbabwe and Australia
In April 2018, he was named in Pakistan's Test squad for their tours to Ireland and England in May 2018, but he did not play.

On 8 July 2018, Fakhar scored 91 runs against Australia in the tri-series final in Harare to help Pakistan secure the title. He was named man of the final and man of the series. During his innings he also became the first Pakistani batsman to score 500 or more runs in T20Is in a calendar year.

On 20 July 2018, in the fourth ODI against Zimbabwe, he became the first batsman for Pakistan to score a double century in ODIs, finishing 210 not out. In the same match, he and Imam-ul-Haq made the then highest opening partnership in ODIs, scoring 304 runs. His innings propelled Pakistan's total to 399, which was their highest score in ODIs.

Two days later, in the fifth match of the series, Zaman became the fastest player to score 1,000 runs in ODIs. He reached the milestone in 18 innings, beating the previous record of 21 innings, held by five other batsmen. Zaman went on to score 85 runs in the match, bringing his total to 515 runs in the series, the most by a Pakistan batsman in a bilateral ODI series. Zaman and Imam had scored 705 runs together across the series, the most by a pair in a bilateral ODI series. Zaman also recorded the most runs scored by a batsman between two dismissals in ODIs, with 455.

In September 2018, he was named in Pakistan's Test squad for their series against Australia. He made his Test debut for Pakistan against Australia on 16 October 2018. He made 94 and 66 on Test debut.

2019: Cricket World Cup year
In April 2019, he was named in Pakistan's squad for the 2019 Cricket World Cup. Ahead of the Cricket World Cup, in the ODI series against England, Zaman scored 138 runs in the second ODI match. This was the highest individual total for a Pakistan batsman against England in a One Day International. However, three days later, Imam-ul-Haq set a new record with 151 runs, in the third ODI of the series.

2020–present
In June 2020, he was named in a 29-man squad for Pakistan's tour to England during the COVID-19 pandemic. However, on 23 June 2020, Zaman was one of seven players from Pakistan's squad to test positive for COVID-19.

On 4 April 2021, in the second ODI against South Africa, Zaman scored 193 runs. It was the highest individual score while chasing in an ODI match, surpassing 185 scored by Shane Watson against Bangladesh. Pakistan lost the ODI by 17 runs, with Fakhar's 193 being the second-highest score in an ODI defeat, behind Charles Coventry's 194 not out. On 5 May 2021, Zaman was nominated for the ICC's Player of the Month award for April. In September 2021, he was named as one of three travelling reserve players in Pakistan's squad for the 2021 ICC Men's T20 World Cup.

In the annual ICC Awards in January 2022, Fakhar Zaman was named in the ICC Men's ODI Team of the Year for the year 2021. On 30 January 2022, Fakhar scored his first Pakistan Super League century, against the Karachi Kings.

In the ICC Men's T20 World Cup 2022, Zaman was ruled out of the event after he suffered a knee injury when playing against the Netherlands.

See also
 List of highest individual scores in ODIs
 List of One Day International cricket double centuries

References

External links
 

1990 births
Living people
Pakistani cricketers
Pakistan Test cricketers
Pakistan One Day International cricketers
Pakistan Twenty20 International cricketers
Baluchistan cricketers
Khyber Pakhtunkhwa cricketers
Pakistan Navy personnel
Pashtun people
Peshawar cricketers
Lahore Qalandars cricketers
Comilla Victorians cricketers
Karachi cricketers
Karachi Blues cricketers
Habib Bank Limited cricketers
Cricketers from Mardan
Cricketers at the 2019 Cricket World Cup
Brisbane Heat cricketers